The Belgian Parcours Shooting Association is the Belgian association for practical shooting under the International Practical Shooting Confederation.

External links 
 Official homepage of the Belgian Parcours Shooting Association

References 

Regions of the International Practical Shooting Confederation
Sports organisations of Belgium